Kinetic Honda was a joint venture between Kinetic Engineering Limited, India and Honda Motor Company, Japan. Kinetic was the first company to have a joint venture with HMSI. The partnership operated from 1984 to 1998, manufacturing two-stroke scooters in India. In 1998, the joint venture was terminated after which Kinetic Engineering continued to sell the models under the brand name Kinetic until 2008 when the interests were sold to Mahindra. Mahindra later wound up their two wheeler business, owing to poor sales.

The brand Kinetic Honda is remembered for its legacy two-stroke scooters which were in fact based on the Honda NH series, with continuously variable transmission and electric start, first in India when it was launched (in 1984), and the only in India until the late 1990s.

Model history
 1984: Kinetic DX — 98cc, two-stroke, single mirror, black plastic finish
 1984: Kinetic EX — 98cc, two-stroke, single mirror, black plastic finish, no indicators (replaced by black blocks), limited colour versions
 1994: Kinetic ZX — 98cc, two-stroke, double mirror, wind shield, more graphical stickers, grey plastic finish
 1995: Kinetic Marvel — 99cc, two-stroke, double mirror, wide shield, more graphical stickers, red, white and blackish blue plastic finish and with pure Honda 2 stroke Engine (Awarded Scooter Of The Year)
 2000: Kinetic Y2K
 2001: Kinetic ZX Zoom — 110cc, two-stroke; otherwise as the ZX
 2002: Kinetic Nova
 2005: Kinetic 4s — 111.5cc, four-stroke
 2006: Kinetic Kine
 2008: Kinetic Jupiter and Kinetic Blaze

Notes

References

 

Defunct motor vehicle manufacturers of India
Honda motorcycles
Indian motor scooters